Money in the Pocket may refer to:
Money in the Pocket (Joe Zawinul album), 1967
Money in the Pocket (Cannonball Adderley album), recorded in 1966 and released in 2005